Dogninades is a monotypic moth genus of the family Erebidae described by Schaus in 1916. Its only species, Dogninades jactatalis, was first described by Francis Walker in 1859 (sources vary). It is found in Venezuela.

References

Herminiinae
Monotypic moth genera